Don Harold Stassen Jayawardena (born 17 August 1942 in Ja-Ela, Sri Lanka), known as Harry Jayawardena, is a Sri Lankan industrialist. He is chairman of Melstacorp PLC and is the Honorary Consul General for Denmark in Sri Lanka. Forbes listed him as one of the richest people in Sri Lanka.

Early career
Jayawardena first joined a British-owned tea export firm in Colombo as a tea trader. He moved to government-owned State Trading Corporation (Consolidated Exports), better known as Consolexpo Ltd, becoming the head of the Tea Department, which controlled the monopoly of tea exports of Sri Lanka under the administration of Prime Minister Sirima Bandaranaike in the 1970s.

Private sector
After resigning from Consolidated Exports, Jayawardena founded Stassen Exports Limited on 7 September 1977 in order to export Ceylon Tea. In 1988 Jayawardena's companies became a significant shareholder of the country's largest private commercial bank, Hatton National Bank. These companies later ventured into many other areas. In 1992, his business empire bought a controlling interest in the Distilleries Company of Sri Lanka PLC (DCSL), which was at the time the largest transaction in the Colombo Stock Exchange. In 2007, under Jayawardena's Chairmanship, DCSL became the No. 1 listed company as per the "Business Today" Top 10 rankings.

Business interests 
Jayawardena is a major shareholder and Chairman of the board of directors of the following Colombo Stock Exchange companies:
 Distilleries Company of Sri Lanka
 Lanka Milk Foods - Chairman/Founder
 Madulsima Plantations - Chairman/Managing Director
 Balangoda Plantations - Chairman/Managing Director 
 Browns Beach Hotels
 Aitken Spence
 Aitken Spence Hotel Holdings
 Melstacorp

Jayawardena has interests in these publicly traded companies:
 Hatton National Bank
 Development Finance Corporation of Ceylon (DFCC)

And in these private companies:
 Stassen Group
 Milford Exports
 Lanka Dairies
 Ambewela Livestock Company
 Pattipola Livestock Company
 Lanka Bell
 Continental Insurance Lanka

Company Awards and recognition 
Jayawardena is the chairman of both Distilleries Company of Sri Lanka and Aitken Spence, these companies were the first Sri Lankan companies ever to be listed on the Forbes List of best managed companies outside the USA. In 2007, Distilleries Company of Sri Lanka PLC is the sole Sri Lankan company to be listed once again in the Forbes List of Asia's best 200 under a US$1 Billion.

Controversy 
During December 2006 alleged attempt to remove the Chairman of the Distilleries Company of Sri Lanka, Jayawardena, then managing director of DCSL, was allegedly quoted as threatening to shoot the chairman. Subsequently, Harry Jayawardena assumed duties as the Chairman of DCSL. The same news paper alleged that Jayawardena threatened a customs officer, many years back.

Jayawardena announced his voluntary resignation from CPC (Ceylon Petroleum Corporation) on 12, January 2012, a post given by Sri Lankan President Mahinda Rajapaksa. Due to his personal issues he has announced his resignation.

Honorary positions 
Jayawardena has held honorary positions including the Senior Adviser for International Trade and Foreign Investments to the then Sri Lankan President Chandrika Kumaratunga. He was a member of Colombo Stock Exchange for many years. He was a member of the Apex Task Force to Rebuild the Nation (TAFREN) established by the President of Sri Lanka after the December 2004 tsunami. He was also appointed Chairman of SriLankan Airlines, Sri Lanka's National carrier, becoming Executive chairman in January 2008.

Honors
Jayawardena was awarded the title of Deshamanya by the President of Sri Lanka for his services to the industry in 2005. In 2010, he was appointed Knight of the Order of Dannebrog by Queen Margrethe II for his services to Denmark as its Honorary Consul General in Sri Lanka. He received the award for his outstanding and exemplary contribution to Denmark and for fostering bilateral ties between Sri Lanka and Denmark.

References 

Living people
1942 births
Sinhalese businesspeople
Sri Lankan presidential advisers
Deshamanya
Knights of the Order of the Dannebrog
Alumni of De Mazenod College